|}

The Dick Poole Stakes is a Group 3 flat horse race in Great Britain open to two-year-old fillies. It is run at Salisbury over a distance of 6 furlongs (1,207 metres), and it is scheduled to take place each year in September. It was formerly contested at Listed level and was raised to Group 3 status in 2014.

The race is named in honour of Colonel Dick Poole, a racehorse trainer, breeder and owner, and was the brainchild of Peter Walwyn and his one-time assistant Mark Smyly.

Records
Leading jockey since 1988 (3 wins):
 Richard Hughes - Dancing Drop (1996), Imperial Beauty (1998), Winning Express (2012)

Leading trainer since 1988 (3 wins):
 John Dunlop – May Hinton (1989), Najiya (1995), Tashawak (2001)
 Richard Hannon Jr. - Anna Nerium (2017), Dark Lady (2019), Happy Romance (2020)

Winners since 1988

See also 
 Horse racing in Great Britain
 List of British flat horse races

References

 Racing Post:
 ifhaonline.org – International Federation of Horseracing Authorities – Dick Poole Fillies' Stakes (2019).

Flat races in Great Britain
Flat horse races for two-year-old fillies
Salisbury Racecourse